{{DISPLAYTITLE:C9H6N2O3}}
The molecular formula C9H6N2O3 (molar mass: 190.16 g/mol, exact mass: 190.0378 u) may refer to:

 4-Nitroquinoline 1-oxide
 Nitroxoline